WideOpenWest (doing business as WOW!) is the eighth largest cable operator in the United States with their network passing 1.9 million homes and businesses. The company offers landline telephone, cable television, and broadband Internet services. As of November 3, 2022, WOW! has about 538,100 subscribers.

After a 2017 initial public offering, WideOpenWest is publicly traded with Avista Capital Partners and Crestview Partners retaining significant stakes. As of August 6, 2019 Avista Capital Partners sold their shares in the company, leaving Crestview Partners WOW's largest shareholder holding a 37% stake in the company.

History
WOW! was founded in November 1996 in Denver, Colorado. After building a network in April 2001, WOW! initially served about 200 people in the Denver area. In November 2001, WOW! purchased Americast, an overbuild system in the Midwest built and operated by Ameritech New Media for an undisclosed amount per subscriber, estimated to have been at a cost of $600 per sub. This purchase opened WOW! to over 310,000 new customers in metropolitan areas surrounding the cities of Chicago, Cleveland, Columbus, Detroit, Denver, and Evansville. WOW! no longer serves the Columbus, Cleveland, or Denver markets.

Avista Capital Partners completed its acquisition of cable operator WideOpenWest (“WOW!”) from Oak Hill Capital Partners and ABRY Partners. Terms of the transaction were not disclosed.

On August 23, 2011, Wave Broadband and WOW! announced that they entered into an agreement to purchase substantially all of the assets of Broadstripe LLC, a provider of residential and commercial bundled communications services. On January 14, WOW! completed the acquisition of Broadstripe's cable systems in Michigan.

In April 2012, WOW! purchased Knology, a broadband company, operating in 13 markets. With the merger the combined customer total will be over 800,000.  Knology had previously merged with Valley Telephone Company in 1999, Prairiewave Communications in 2007, Graceba Total Communications in 2008, and Sunflower Broadband in 2011.

In June 2014, WOW! sold its cable, Internet and phone systems in the South Dakota markets to Clarity Telecom. Part of the multimillion-dollar deal, worth $262 million, included the markets in Iowa and Minnesota previously served by Knology and PrairieWave Communications. In March 2015 these markets would officially become known as Vast Broadband.

In September 2016, WOW! purchased NuLink, a cable company serving Newnan, Georgia with approximately 34,000 customers at the time the deal closed.

In October 2016, WOW! came to an agreement with Midco to sell its systems in Lawrence, Kansas.  These systems currently pass approximately 67,000 homes and businesses in the area.

On June 28, 2017, WOW! officially no longer serves the Lawrence, Kansas area.

On March 6, 2018 WOW! announced that they had deployed DOCSIS 3.1 to 95% of their footprint, one of the first cable operators to reach that near-ubiquitous threshold.

On June 30, 2021 WOW! stated that it is selling its Cleveland and Columbus, Ohio, service areas to Atlantic Broadband (since renamed Breezeline) for $1.13 billion; it closed the deal on September 1, 2021. Also on June 30, WOW! announced the sale of its systems in Chicago; Evansville, Indiana; and Anne Arundel, Maryland to Astound Broadband for $661 million.

Internet availability by state

Network availability by city

See also 
 NebuAd

References

External links 
 

Cable television companies of the United States
Companies based in Englewood, Colorado
American companies established in 1996
Telecommunications companies established in 1996
Economy of the Midwestern United States
Internet service providers of the United States
Telecommunications companies of the United States
Companies listed on the New York Stock Exchange
2017 initial public offerings
1996 establishments in Colorado